All Japan Intercollegiate Basketball Championship (全日本大学バスケットボール選手権大会 zen nippon daigaku Basukettoboru senshuken taikai) is an annual nationwide intercollegiate basketball tournament. It is the largest scale amateur sport event in Japan.

The tournament, organized by the All Japan Intercollegiate Basketball Federation and Asahi Shimbun, takes place in December at Yoyogi National Gymnasium.

Previous winners
men

women

See also
NCAA Men's Division I Basketball Championship
NCAA Women's Division I Basketball Championship
All Japan Basketball Championships

College basketball competitions
Basketball competitions in Japan
Recurring sporting events established in 1949
1949 establishments in Japan